A jasagh ( засаг, or засаг ноён; ; lit. Power, Authority) was the head of a Mongol banner or khoshun during the Qing dynasty and the Bogd Khanate. The position was held by hereditary succession by certain Mongol princes, most of whom were descendants of Genghis Khan. The princes who did not serve as Jasagh were known as sula ( - empty vacant free, loose) or hohi taiji.

List of jasaghs
The list only include major jasaghs under Prince title.

Inner jasaghs

Aohan Tribes
Leaders of Aohan league held a title of the Prince of the Second Rank. Only the last jasagh was promoted to the Prince of the First Rank.

Ordos Tribes

Harqin Tribes

Khorchin Tribes 
Jasagh of the Khorchin banner held a title of Prince Bodlogtoi of the First Rank. Some jasaghs made a huge contribution to the Qing Dynasty by settling a military merit. Leaders of Khorchin league also became prince consorts by the tradition of diplomatic marriages between Khorchin Mongols and Manchus

Another title held by the jasagh of the Khorchin banner was Prince Darhan of the First Rank. The lineage was more prestigious than previous one. Most holders of the title were prince consorts and relatives of Qing Dynasty most prominent imperial consorts. 

Prince Zhuoliketu of the First Rank was one of the titles reserved for jasaghs of the Khorchin league

Outer jasaghs

Khalkha Tribes 
Leaders of the Khalkha league held a title of the Prince of the First Rank. The title of Prince Darhan of the First Rank was demoted to the Prince of the Third Rank and subsequently recovered.

Sayin Noyan league 
Sayin Noyan was a part of Khalkha valley. Jasagh of Sayin Noyan league held a title of Prince of the First Rank. Jasaghs of Sayin Noyan were treated like leaders of Khalkha league.

Oriat Tribes

Altishahr 
Altishahr (Turki Muslim major area in Xinjiang), which also the same Jasagh rulers, two of six had “Wang”(king) title.

 Kumul Khanate- Muslim banner, held a title of Prince of the First Rank.
 Turpan- Muslim banner, held a title of Prince of the Second Rank.

References

Mongolia under Qing rule